Anija Nature Reserve is a nature reserve which is located in Harju County, Estonia.

The area of the nature reserve is 72 ha.

The protected area was founded in 1990 on the basis of Anija botanical-landscape conservation area. In 1999 the protected area was designated to the nature reserve.

References

Nature reserves in Estonia
Geography of Harju County